"Sting" is a song co-written and performed by American pop singer Fletcher. It is the opening track from her debut studio album Girl of My Dreams and was issued as the album's third single. An official lyric video for the song was released on September 1, 2022; one day before the single's official release.

Chart positions

References

2022 songs
2022 singles
Capitol Records singles
Fletcher (singer) songs
Songs written by Jennifer Decilveo
Songs written by Fletcher (singer)
Songs written by Malay (record producer)
Songs written by Ali Payami